Trygve Henrik Hoff (7 July 1938 – 2 December 1987), born in Rognan, Nordland, was a Norwegian singer, composer, songwriter, and writer. He was a teacher at Buskerud folkehøgskole (Heimtun) for many years when he lived in Darbu, Øvre Eiker. For some time, Trygve Hoff was the conductor of Berlevåg Mannsangforening.

Hoff was born and raised in Rognan, Nordland. His work as a writer and artist showed an appreciation of his roots, and he found inspiration for his texts from his home in Northern Norway. Hoff was awarded the Nordland fylkes kulturpris (Nordland County Culture award) posthumously in 1988.

The newspaper Nordlys and the television channel NRK named Hoff's Snart gryr en dag as the best North Norwegian compilation albums of all time. Hoff's songs often depicted the way of living in Northern Norway. He described the women working in the fish fillet industry in Jentan på fileten, and wrote several songs for other artists. Hoff toured Northern Norway frequently.

"Har en drøm" and "Ei hand å holde i" are songs that were given to Jørn Hoel, and were major hits in Norway. Sissel Kyrkjebø's debut record Sissel contains five songs written by Trygve Hoff: Tenn et lys, I ditt smil» and «Dagen gryr» (composed by Svein Gundersen) as well as Inn til deg (composed by Lars Muh) and «Det skal lyse en sol» (composed by Lasse Holm). "Trygve Hoff's shows are characterized by an unvarnished joy of life."

Trygve Hoff had three children: Ståle, Stig Henrik, and Siv Elisabeth. Ståle Hoff was, like Trygve, a skilled musician. He contributed to several of his father's recordings, and together with Terje Blickfeldt, he composed «Folk e så bra». Stig Henrik Hoff and Siv Elisabeth Hoff are well-established actors. Trygve Hoff was buried at Fiskum Church.

Discography 
1979 Kokfesk
1980 Fokti
1980 Rækved og lørveblues
1983 Dele med dæ
1985 Midt i livet
1988 Snart gryr en dag   (compilation)
1993 Lån mæ no'n tima (compilation)
1994 Trygve Hoff (album) (released by Televerket)
1995 Trollfjell her i nord (Audiobook. Collaboration with Karl Erik Harr)
2008 Kokfesk & Ballader (samleplate) (best of compilation)

Selected recordings by other artist
Albums by other artists containing songs written by Trygve Hoff:
1986 Sissel Kyrkjebø – Sissel
1987 Jørn Hoel – Varme ut av is
1988 Solfrid Hoff (now Solfrid Nilsen) – Prinsessa i tårnet
1994 Sissel Kyrkjebø – Amazing Grace
1995 Bodø-oktetten – Nocturne i Nord
1995 Jørn Hoel – Jørn Hoels beste

Bibliography
1981 Kokfesk, ballader og lørveblues
1982 Trollfjell her nord. Later available as audio-book, read by Trygve Hoff himself.
1984 Eventyr langs leia
1985 Lyset i mørketida
1983 Villblomar i visehagen (editor)

Trygve Hoff's memorial fund and memorial award 
The Trygve Hoff memorial fund was established on February 12, 1988, two months following his death. The fund receives capital through memorial concerts, public grants, donations and gifts. The fund was established in order to award the Trygve Hoff memorial award. This award is given to a person, or group of persons, that contribute to the cultural life in the spirit of Trygve Hoff.

Tygve Hoff's memorial award

1989 Norsk Revyfestival
2000 Bente Reibo
2004 Bjørn Andor Drage
2006 Alt for Rognan
2008 Kristin Mellem

References

External links
article about Trygve Hoff
Blåfrostfestivalen praises Trygve Hoff
Kulturnett about Trygve Hoff
About Trygve Hoff in "Norwegian Biographical encyclopedia"

1938 births
1987 deaths
Norwegian songwriters
People from Saltdal
20th-century Norwegian male singers
20th-century Norwegian singers